Karur  is a village in the karur Avadaiyarkoilrevenue block of Pudukkottai district, Tamil Nadu, India.

Demographics 
 census, Karur had a total population of 2490 with 1225 males and 1265 females. Out of the total population 1541 people were literate.

References

Villages in Pudukkottai district